is a Japanese anime production enterprise, founded on March 3, 1997. Presided over by Tarō Maki, its headquarters is located in Roppongi, Minato, Tokyo. It has produced numerous anime series such as Honey and Clover, Nodame Cantabile, Elfen Lied, Kino's Journey, Accel World, Sword Art Online, Genshiken and Toradora. It has also co-produced original creations like Yasuomi Umetsu's Wizard Barristers and did project collaborations like in Hero Tales (with Hiromu Arakawa and Studio Flag) and in Xebec's Mnemosyne no Musume-tachi.

Productions
Genco produced most of ARMS' non-hentai titles and A.C.G.T's animation projects. It also works with J.C. Staff in some of its productions.

References

External links
 Official site 
 Official site 
 

 
Entertainment companies established in 1997
Mass media companies established in 1997
Entertainment companies of Japan
Japanese companies established in 1997
Animation studios in Tokyo
Japanese animation studios
Roppongi